Saint Nicholas Chapel orthodox (PCU) chapel, a newly discovered architectural monument in the village of Shmankivtsi, Zavodske settlement hromada, Chortkiv Raion, Ternopil Oblast of Ukraine. Located on the eastern outskirts of the village.

History 

In 1869, in honor of the abolition of serfdom in the eastern suburbs was built a chapel of St. Nicholas. Mykola Karpinsky was the founder of the construction.

In 1926, after returning from work, a resident of the village Martin Vavrynevych restored the chapel and donated the figure of St. Nicholas.

During the Bolshevik regime, the shrine was destroyed. The late Yosyp Sivak and Mykhailo Vavrynevych built a cover for the figure with their own hands and moved it to the courtyard of the Church of Saints Cosmas and Damian. The abandoned chapel was later damaged again.

The idea of restoring the shrine in 1989 was proposed by women who worked in the fields. Repairs were started, floors were covered and plastered. Volodymyr Zyatyk (roofing), Petro Zakharchuk (doors), Orest Vavrynevych (framing and throne for the image of St. Nicholas) and many other people who contributed to the fundraiser also contributed to the work. The two most active fellow villagers, Anna Matskiv and Melania Vavrynevych, planned to buy the image of St. Nicholas. To do this, they went to the town of Sokal in the Lviv region to Zinovy Timoshyk, who was one of the church's painters. He painted an image and sacrificed it.

On May 26, 2019, a festive prayer was held on the occasion of the 150th anniversary of the Chapel of St. Nicholas.

Modernity 
Currently, the chapel is cared for by the Vavrynevych-Ushiy family. Every year on December 18–19 fellow villagers come to light a candle for a good year, the harvest. The chapel protects the village from natural disasters and calamities.

References

Sources 

 Шманьківці. Храм св. вмч. і безсрр Косми і Даміана // Храми Української Православної Церкви Київського патріархату. Тернопільщина / Автор концепції Куневич Б.; головний редактор Буяк Я.; фото: Снітовський О., Крочак І., Кислинський Е., Бурдяк В. — Тернопіль : ТОВ «Новий колір», 2012. — С. 383. : іл. — ISBN 978-966-2061-24-6.
 Smankivci // Історичний шематизм Львівської архієпархії (1832—1944) : у 2 т. / Дмитро Блажейовський. — Київ : КМ Академія, 2004. — Т. 1 : Адміністрація і парохії. — С. 744–745. — ISBN 966-518-225-0.
 Smankivci // Блажейовський Д. Історичний шематизм Станиславівської єпархії від її заснування до початку Другої світової війни (1885—1938). — Записки ЧСВВ, Секція I. — Т. 51. — Львів : Місіонер, 2002. — С. 212. — ISBN 966-658-228-4.
 Огородник, М. Відроджена капличка // Вільне життя плюс. — 2015. — No. 88 (30 жовтня). — С. 5. — (Спогад).
 Огородник, М. Під прихистком святого Миколая // Голос народу. — 2016. — No. 24 (17 червня). — С. 5. — (Духовні обереги).
 Огородник, М. Під прихистком святого Миколая // Вільне життя плюс. — 2016. — No. 51 (1 липня). — С. 5. — (Обереги).
 Огородник, М. Під прихистком святого Миколая // Домашня газета. — 2016. — No. 28 (14 липня). — С. 8. — (Рідний край).
 Огородник, М. Немає нічого ріднішого як рідна Батьківщина... // Свобода. — 2017. — No. 39 (19 травня). — С. 2.
 Огородник, М. Погляд крізь століття... // Чортківський Вісник. — 2018. — No. 8 (16 березня). — С. 4. — (Краєзнавство).
 Огородник, М. Півтора століття під омофором Миколая Чудотворця // Наш день. — 2019. — No. 22 (4 червня). — С. 8. — (Духовність).
 Тимчук, Л. Святиня оберігає село // Сільський господар плюс Тернопільщина. — 2019. — No. 22 (5 червня). — С. 3.

Shmankivtsi